Street of Missing Men is a 1939 American drama film directed by Sidney Salkow and written by Frank Dolan and Leonard Lee. The film stars Charles Bickford, Harry Carey, Tommy Ryan, Guinn "Big Boy" Williams, Ralph Graves and John Gallaudet. The film was released on April 25, 1939, by Republic Pictures.

Plot

Cast
Charles Bickford as Cash Darwin
Harry Carey as Charles Putnam
Tommy Ryan as Tommy Blake
Guinn "Big Boy" Williams as T-Bone
Ralph Graves as Mike Reardon
John Gallaudet as Kinsella
Nana Bryant as Mrs. Putnam
Mabel Todd as Dovie
Regis Toomey as Jim Parker

References

External links
 

1939 films
1930s English-language films
American drama films
1939 drama films
Republic Pictures films
Films directed by Sidney Salkow
American black-and-white films
1930s American films